Chirya is a village in Charkhi Dadri District in the State of Haryana, India.  Located on Charkhi Dadri-Kanina road, it is under Badhara constituency. The population of this village is approximately 5604. The village famous for its agriculture and army tradition .

Location
The village is located in south-east direction of Charkhi Dadri. It is located at 28°27'N latitude and 76°15'E longitude.

Geography
Average elevation of this village is 217 m.

Population
The total population of village Chirya is 5604. Total number of males is 2908 and that of females is 2696 (according to census 2011)
Literacy rate among males is 77.71 and among females is 56.67.

References

Villages in Bhiwani district